Lord of the Fantastic is a 1998 anthology honoring the work of science fiction writer Roger Zelazny. The title is both a play off his novel Lord of Light and an homage to Zelazny.  Many authors and friends of Roger's came together to write this book; it also includes personal comments by many of the contributors.  The book was edited by Martin H. Greenberg.

Contents

 "Introduction" by Fred Saberhagen
 "Lethe" by Walter Jon Williams
 "The Story Roger Never Told" by Jack Williamson
 "The Somehow Not Yet Dead" by Nina Kiriki Hoffman
 "Calling Pittsburgh" by Steven Brust
 "If I Take the Wings of Morning" by Katharine Eliska Kimbriel
 "Ki'rin and the Blue and White Tiger" by Jane Lindskold
 "The Eryx" by Robert Sheckley
 "Southern Discomfort" by Jack C. Haldeman II
 "Suicide Kings" by John J. Miller
 "Changing of the Guard" by Robert Wayne McCoy and Thomas F. Monteleone
 "The Flying Dutchman" by John Varley
 "Ninekiller and the Neterw" by William Sanders
 "Call Me Titan" by Robert Silverberg
 "The Outling" by Andre Norton
 "Arroyo de Oro" by Pati Nagle
 "Back in 'the Real World'" by Bradley H. Sinor
 "Mad Jack" by Jennifer Roberson
 "Movers and Shakers" by Paul Dellinger
 "The Halfway House at the Heart of Darkness" by William Browning Spencer
 "Only the End of the World Again" by Neil Gaiman
 "Slow Symphonies of Mass and Time" by Gregory Benford
 "Asgard Unlimited" by Michael A. Stackpole
 "Wherefore the Rest is Silence" by Gerald Hausman

1999 anthologies
Fantasy anthologies
Science fiction anthologies
HarperCollins books
Festschrifts